The Union of Bookworkers of Belgium (CBB) was a trade union representing printers and bookbinders in Belgium.

After World War I, the unions affiliated to the Trade Union Commission (SK) were increasingly able to achieve agreements which covered the entire printing industry.  The SK persuaded the Central Union of Bookbinders and the Union of Lithographers to merge in 1924, although the Belgian Typographical Federation (FTB) refused to join.

The new union affiliated to the SK, with 4,421 members.  This increased to 5,186 by the end of 1925, and then gradually declined.  In 1937, it transferred from the SK to its successor, the General Labour Confederation of Belgium.  During the Nazi occupation, it affiliated to the collaborationist Union of Manual and Spiritual Workers, but suffered the loss of most of its members.

At the start of 1945, the union joined with former members of the FTB, to form the Paper and Publishing Industry Union.  From 1924 until 1935, the union's general secretary was Henri Berckmans.

Presidents
1924: Jean Pladet
1924: Corneel Mertens

References

Printing trade unions
Trade unions in Belgium
Trade unions established in 1924
Trade unions disestablished in 1945
1924 establishments in Belgium
1945 disestablishments in Belgium